Nursultan Nazarbayev International Airport , formerly Astana International Airport, is an international airport in the Akmola Region of Kazakhstan. It is the primary international airport serving Astana, the capital city of Kazakhstan. The airport is the second-busiest international air passenger gateway into Central Asia (after Almaty International Airport), the 13th busiest airport in the Post-Soviet states and the second-busiest airport in terms of passenger traffic in Kazakhstan, with 5,099,391 passengers in 2019.

The airport features two passenger terminals and one runway as well as cargo and maintenance facilities. Terminal 2 was designed by the late Japanese architect Kisho Kurokawa. It serves as the primary hub of Kazakhstan's flag carrier – Air Astana, and is the primary operating base for SCAT Airlines, Qazaq Air, low-cost carrier – FlyArystan and was also formerly a hub for Starlines Kazakhstan and Tselinograd OAO.

The facility opened in 1931 as Akmolinsk Airport then, as the city changed its name, renamed as Tselinograd Airport and then as Astana International Airport. With a government decree, the airport was renamed Nursultan Nazarbayev International Airport as a tribute to the first President. On June 8, 2020, the airport officially changed its three-character IATA airport code from TSE to NQZ. It has been recognised as the 'Best Regional Airport in Central Asia and CIS' at the Skytrax World Airport Awards 2022.

History
The airport was built in 1930, three kilometers from Akmolinsk (now – Astana) within the area of today's modern architectural tower of Baiterek. There was a square field for aircraft take-off and landing, an adobe 8-room station with a small waiting hall, a two-room house for pilots, and fuel storage on the airport grounds. In December 1931, the first airfield of Astana was built on the outskirts of the town and was developed further after World War II. Regular air traffic was established between Semipalatinsk and Akmolinsk (day of enterprise establishment).

During times of flooding, the aerodrome was closed. Communication between the aerodrome and the city was by phone, ferry (there was no bridge over Ishim River), and footpath. In the first few years, the air traffic was ad-hoc by character, with loose timetables, such as "Aircraft departure on Monday morning" or "On Wednesday at sunrise". Transportation of passengers, mail, and cargo was carried out by Kalinin K-4, Kalinin K-5, Polikarpov R-5, Petlyakov Pe-2 aircraft. Regular flights were established in 1934, with the following routes: Alma-Ata – Karaganda – Akmolinsk – Atbasar – Kostanay – Sverdlovsk. Karaganda – Petropavlovsk – Korgalzhyn – Akmolinsk.

At the beginning of 1946, the first group of Polikarpov Po-2 aircraft arrived in Akmolinsk for regular service. The group belonged to a Karaganda aviation enterprise. The following routes were opened for passenger and mail transportation: Akmolinsk – Korgalzhyn – Aksu – Astrakhanka – Balkashino (settlements of Akmolinsk region). The operations division was organized consisting of two people. In 1946, aviation began to render services for the national economy – medical aviation.

From 1947 to 1948, a fleet of three Polikarpov Po-2 aircraft was formed at the Akmolinsk airport base. This fleet was part of an air group that was based in Karaganda. The airport was equipped with modern equipment (for the time), construction development has started: a Finnish house for a radio station, three buildings and a garage were built. The total number of staff numbered 40 to 50 people. The airport began servicing heavier types of aircraft such as Lisunov Li-2 in addition to light aircraft. On November 4, 1963, Tselinograd Airport (formerly known as – Akmolinsk) accepted the first Ilyushin Il-18 aircraft in the new terminal, located 18 kilometers from the city. In December 1963, Ilyushin Il-18 aircraft began to operate regular flights. The airport terminal was at a building stage, therefore the adapted two-story building served as the air terminal, where the air traffic control service had been located.

In February 1966, the new air terminal was transferred into operation. In June of the same year, all services of united aviagroup relocated to the new airport. By 1969, the aircraft park of Tselinograd aviagroup was replenished with the first Antonov An-24 aircraft. With the arrival of the Antonov An-24, the volume of passenger, mail, and cargo transportation sharply increased. People began to fly to many cities of the former Soviet Union. In 1975, the Tupolev Tu-154 first landed in the airport. After that, regular flights by Tupolev Tu-154 on the Alma-Ata – Tselinograd – Moscow route were started. The historical mark for Akmola (Astana) aviators was the change of the capital in 1998. Airdrome reconstruction begun and finished in a relatively short time: the runway with artificial covering was extended for about 3500 meters; the taxiway and apron were also expanded. Lighting systems and radio navigation equipment were replaced. The VIP building was constructed, and the airport complex was reconstructed.

On February 2, 2005, a large-scale international airport reconstruction project was completed with the grand opening of the new 25,000 square-meter passenger terminal. The number of check-in counters was increased to 24 along with two luggage straps. Currently, the Terminal 2 is used to service domestic flights. On November 19, 2015, the grand opening of the 2,400 square-meter Business Aviation Terminal took place. The BAT area has a 200-passenger per hour capacity. The terminal building housed a lounge bar, a conference hall, rooms for negotiations, convenience for passengers with children, a duty-free shop, there are 52 parking spaces for guests.

Within the framework of the Infrastructure Development Program, a new passenger terminal for international flights was built in 2017. A new terminal of 47,000 square meters adds six new aircraft parking lots with landing sleeves and four bus landing routes to the airport infrastructure and also includes a variety of technologies and processes designed to improve the quality of service at the airport.

"N" stands for Nursultan Nazarbayev International Airport, as well as the name of the Kazakh capital of Astana. "QZ" is an acronym for Qazaqstan according to the new version of Kazakh alphabet based on the Latin script.

Facilities
The airport is the primary hub of Air Astana and is a primary operating base for SCAT Airlines, low-cost carrier – FlyArystan, Qazaq Air. It has two passenger terminals (T1 and T2), a business aviation terminal as well as cargo and maintenance facilities. In 2019, it served 5,099,391 passengers, an increase of 12.1% compared to 2018, making it the second-busiest airport in Kazakhstan. The busiest single destination in passenger numbers is Almaty.

Runway
The airport is equipped with a Category IIIA (both directions) Instrument Landing System (ILS) approach to guide landing aircraft safely under very poor weather conditions and also allowing planes to land in low visibility conditions, such as fog. The airport is able to accommodate jets the size of the Il-76, Antonov An-124 Ruslan, and Boeing 747-400F.

It can also accept light aircraft and helicopters of all types.

Terminals

There are separate terminal buildings for domestic and international flights. Both terminals are adjacent, sharing a single car park and have a connecting corridor for transit passengers.

T1 – International Terminal 
The new international terminal (labelled "T1") opened in June 2017. Plans for the new terminal show 5–6 new departure gates complementing the gates in the previously existing terminal building. 47,000 sq. M. and completed construction in time for the EXPO 2017, and took the role of T1 – International Terminal. The new terminal adds 6 new aircraft parking lots with landing sleeves and 4 bus landing routes to the Airport infrastructure, and also includes a variety of technologies and processes designed to improve the quality of service at the Airport. The new terminal has a public catering area of 1000 square meters, retail outlets occupy 1,300 square meters.

T2 – Domestic Terminal 
The concept of T2 - terminal building has been designed by the late Japanese architect Kisho Kurokawa. With the opening of the new international terminal, the old terminal (now labelled "T2") is now dedicated to departures and arrivals of domestic flights. T2 - was the original and only terminal when the airport was reconstructed in 2005. On 2 February 2005, the grand opening of the T2 passenger terminal of the airport took place. The terminal area is more than 25 thousand square meters. Number of check-in counters - 24, 2 luggage straps. The design of the airport is the fusion of eastern and western traditions. The building has five floors, panoramic elevators, escalators, aerobridges, lounges and the system of automatic check-in for passengers, airport shops, restaurants, cafes, a pharmacy, a call-center, Wi-Fi and other facilities.

Airlines and destinations

Passenger

The following airlines operate regular scheduled, seasonal and charter flights to and from Astana:

Cargo

Statistics

Passenger figures

Busiest routes
Almaty International Airport was the most popular domestic route with 144 weekly flights.

Aviation accidents 
On June 17, 1967, an Aeroflot Li-2 (CCCP-71220) operating from Tselinograd Airport (now Nursultan Nazarbayev International Airport), in Astana to Karaganda airport (now Sary-Arka) stalled and crashed onto a runway at Tselinograd, killing 2 of its 3 crew, and 7 of its 31 passengers.

On October 4, 1989, an Aeroflot An-24 (CCCP-46525), skidded off a runway on approach to Tselinograd Airport due to its pilots landing at excessive speed. After landing, the plane crashed into a pillar of the airport's fence. The plane was written off as damaged beyond repair but none of the 4 pilots or 48 passengers were injured.

On December 25, 2012, an An-72 of the Kazakhstan Border Guards which had taken off from Astana International airport crashed short of the runway at Shymkent International Airport due to low visibility weather and technical malfunctions with the aircraft's barometer. All 27 people aboard the plane were killed.

Access

Public transport

Bus

No. 10 and 12 municipal bus lines connects the airport with the city centre of Astana. Service is available from 06:00 to 22:00 and run from the airport (just outside the airport) to the city center and vice versa with intermediate stops in between. The single fare is  150.

Car and taxi

The airport is located on the Regional Road P3, about 16.7 kilometers (12 mi) from the city center and about 25 minutes drive, depending on traffic. There is extensive car and motorcycle parking space available. Taxis are also available directly outside the terminal building at the airport parking lot (Yandex.Taxi and inDriver). Many taxi companies offer a flat-rate for to/from Airport trips (the rate is usually  1,650), booked via mobile app.

See also
 Transport in Kazakhstan
 List of airports in Kazakhstan
 Kokshetau International Airport (located in Akmola Region  from Astana)
 List of the busiest airports in the former USSR

References

External links

Nursultan Nazarbayev International Airport (official site) 

Airports in Kazakhstan
Airport
Airports established in 1963
1963 establishments in the Kazakh Soviet Socialist Republic